Ochopee is an unincorporated community in Collier County, Florida, United States.  It is located to the east of the intersection of US 41 and State Road 29, near Carnestown. The community is part of the Naples–Marco Island Metropolitan Statistical Area.

The community got its name when a visitor to the general store asked the owner what the place was called. A native man was trading in the store that day so the owner asked him the Seminole word for farm. The farmer replied, "O-Chopp-ee".

Ochopee began as a one-family tomato-farming community in the early 1920s. James Gaunt bought  of land along U.S. Highway 41 for $100 per acre, and started with only army tents. A community called Ochopee grew up around Gaunt's tomato farm.

After the original post office burned down, residents used an old storage shed to house mail. Now the Ochopee Post Office, it is the smallest in the nation. It continues as an active post office and sometime tourist attraction.

The original farm and settlement were gradually absorbed by the federal government as part of a movement to conserve the Everglades. A few small businesses remain, along with the headquarters of the Big Cypress National Preserve. Jeff Whichello, a native of the area, has written a book about his childhood called What Happened to Ochopee?

Points of interest
 Ochopee post office
 Skunk Ape Research Center
 Joannie's Crab Shack
 National Park Service Big Cypress Headquarters, formerly The Golden Lion Motor Inn owned by Whichello's family
 Wootens World Famous Airboats

References

Stone, Maria (1989). Ochopee: The Story of the Smallest Post Office.
Pettengill, Frank (1975). Naples Daily News, "Ochopee Acquisition Appeal Made."
 Whichello, Jeff (2014). What Happened to Ochopee?  A first-hand account of the land grab by the federal government that took place in the 1970s to create the Big Cypress Preserve. 
Just Cause is a 1995 film directed by Arne Glimcher and starring Sean Connery and Laurence Fishburne. It is based on John Katzenbach's novel of the same name.

External links
RoadsideAmerica.com: Smallest Post Office in the United States: Ochopee, Florida.
 

Unincorporated communities in Collier County, Florida
Unincorporated communities in Florida